Magdiwang may refer to the following:

Magdiwang (Katipunan faction), a faction of the 19th century Philippine revolutionary group Katipunan.
Magdiwang, Romblon, a Philippine municipality
Magdiwang Party, a political party in 21st century Philippines